Jack Whittaker may refer to:

Jack Whittaker (lottery winner) (1947–2020), American businessman 
Jack Whittaker (politician), Canadian Member of Parliament

See also
Jack Whitaker (1924-2019), American sportscaster
John Whittaker (disambiguation)
John Whitaker (disambiguation)